Monkstown railway station (also known as Monkstown Halt) served the village of Monkstown in County Antrim, Northern Ireland.

History

The station was opened by the Belfast and Northern Counties Railway on 1 July 1905.

It closed along with the rest of the - line in 1978, but re-opened again for a short period in 1980 when -Antrim stopping services were resumed. The station closed to passengers on 21 February 1981 when the line was once again mothballed. The line has since re-opened in 2001, however Monkstown station has remained closed.

References 

Disused railway stations in County Antrim
Railway stations opened in 1905
Railway stations closed in 1981
1905 establishments in Ireland
Railway stations in Northern Ireland opened in the 20th century